Universidad de Manila, also referred to by its acronym UdM, is a public coeducational city government funded higher education institution in Manila, Philippines. It was founded in April 26, 1995 with the approval by Mayor Alfredo Lim of Manila City Ordinance (MCO) No. 7885 “An Ordinance Authorizing the City Government of Manila to Establish and Operate the Dalubhasaan ng Maynila (City College of Manila)". It offers both academic and technical-vocational courses and programs. 

Its Main Campus is located at the grounds of Mehan Gardens, Ermita in front of the Bonifacio Shrine (Kartilya ng Katipunan) and beside the Central Terminal station of LRT Line 1. It has a satellite Campus (UDM Annex) along Carlos Palanca Street in Santa Cruz.

History 

On 26 April 1995, Manila City Ordinance (MCO) No. 7885 entitled “An Ordinance Authorizing the City Government of Manila to Establish and Operate the Dalubhasaan ng Maynila (City College of Manila) and for such other purposes” was approved by Mayor Alfredo Lim. Its principal sponsors were Manila Councilors Nestor Ponce Jr., Humberto Basco and Bernardito Ang. The then-City College of Manila (CCM) was originally located at the 15-storey Old Philippine National Bank Building in Escolta Street, Binondo. Sometime in 2003, the University established its Downtown Campus (UDM Annex) along Carlos Palanca Street in Santa Cruz.

On 26 June 2006, Mayor Lito Atienza approved MCO No. 8120 which renamed the City College of Manila to Universidad de Manila. UdM was also transferred from Binondo to its current location at Cecilia Muñoz Street corner Antonio J. Villegas Street, Mehan Gardens, Ermita.

On its 25th founding anniversary, Universidad de Manila was granted fiscal autonomy by virtue of MCO No. 8635. This ordinance was approved by Mayor Francisco “Isko Moreno” Domagoso on 27 April 2020 and it states that “the University shall be treated as an independent and institutional department of the City of Manila wherein the management of fiscal, human resources, and all other assets shall be within its control.”

The Downtown Campus was later renamed to Henry Sy Sr. Campus, after the Filipino-Chinese businessman Henry Sy. Its CMIT Building was renovated and turned over on 22 March 2022.

Colleges

College of Arts and Sciences (CAS) 
 Bachelor of Arts in Communication
 Bachelor of Arts in Political Science
 Bachelor in Public Administration
 Bachelor of Science in Mathematics Major in Computer Science
 Bachelor of Science in Psychology
 Bachelor of Science in Social Work

College of Business, Accountancy, and Economics (CBAE) 
 Bachelor of Science in Accounting Information System
 Bachelor in Accounting Technology
 Bachelor of Science in Entrepreneurship
 Bachelor of Science in Entrepreneurship with Specialization in Supply Chain Management
 Bachelor of Science in Accountancy
 Bachelor of Science in Business Administration Major in Economics
 Bachelor of Science in Business Administration Major in Human Resource Development Management
 Bachelor of Science in Business Administration Major in Marketing Management

College of Criminal Justice (CCJ) 
 Bachelor of Science in Criminology

College of Teacher Education (CTE) 
 Bachelor in Secondary Education Major in General Science
 Bachelor in Secondary Education Major in Mathematics
 Bachelor in Secondary Education Major in English
 Bachelor in Physical Education Major in School of Physical Education

College of Engineering and Technology (CET) 
 Bachelor in Electronics Engineering
 Bachelor of Science in Computer Engineering
 Bachelor in Information Technology with Specialization in Cybersecurity
 Bachelor in Information Technology with Specialization in Data Science
 Bachelor of Science in Information Technology

College of Health Science (CHS) 
 Bachelor of Science in Nursing
 Bachelor of Science in Physical Therapy

Graduate programs 
College of Law (COL)
 Juris Doctor with Thesis
 Juris Doctor without Thesis

Institute for Graduate and Professional Studies (IGPS)
 Master in Business Administration
 Master of Science in Criminal Justice
 Master in Public Management and Governance
 Master of Arts in Education
 Doctor of Philosophy

Technical and vocational education and training 

Center for Micro-credentialing and Industry Training (CMIT)

UDM Center for Micro-credentialing and Industry Training was established on 19 June 2020, to offer short-term programs, focusing on specialized learning in order to develop skillset aligned with the interests of the student.

UDM recognized the shift in workplace structure and culture, most prominent during the onset of the COVID-19 pandemic. With an understanding of the needs of the city and different industries, the offerings of the following micro-credentials are set to produce skilled and capable graduates who will thrive in an Industry 4.0 workplace.

 Android Development
 Bookkeeping
 Bread and Pastry Production
 Catering, Food and Beverage Service
 Graphic Design
 Photography DSLR and Mobile
 Programming - Java
 Programming - Python
 Web Development
 Wood Technology
 Coffee Apprenticeship
 2D and 3D Animation

Gallery

References

Educational institutions established in 1995
Education in Ermita
Local colleges and universities in Manila
Universities and colleges in Manila
1995 establishments in the Philippines